Sumati Morarjee (13 March 1909-27 June 1998), also known as the first woman of Indian shipping, is credited to have become the first woman in the world to head an organisation of ship owners - Indian National Steamship Owners Association (later renamed Indian National Shipowners Association) which has been traditionally a male bastion. She has been awarded Padma Vibhushan, the second highest civilian honor of India in 1971 for her civil services.

Early life 
She was born to wealthy family of Mathuradas Goculdas and his wife, Premabai, in Bombay. Sumati was named Jamuna, after the sacred river associated with Krishna in Vrindavan. According to then contemporary customs in India, while still a young girl she was married to Shanti Kumar Narottam Morarjee, the only son of Narottam Morarjee, the founder of Scindia Steam Navigation Company, which later grew to be India's largest shipping firm.

Scindia Steam Navigation Company 

She was included in the managing agency of the company in 1923 at age 14. Sumati built the company from humble beginnings parlaying a few vessels in the company and gradually developing it, till she assumed full charge of the company by 1946, managing over six thousand people. She was already on the board of directors, and her expertise in the shipping trade, developed over many years. Due to her amazing feat, she was also elected the president of Indian National Steamship Owners' Association in 1956 and next two years and again in 1965. It was under her supervision that the company rose to fleet of 43 shipping vessels totalling 552,000 tonnes of dead weight.

From 1979 to 1987, she was chairperson of the company, until the government took over the debt-ridden Scindia Steam Navigation. She was later appointed as the chairperson emeritus of the company till 1992.

Influence of Mahatma Gandhi 

Sumati remained in regular touch with Mahatma Gandhi and both met on several occasions. Their exchange was documented in newspaper reports. He counted her among his closest friends.  Between 1942 and 1946, she was involved in the underground movement for Independence with him.

Accomplishments 
 She was also the founder of the Sumati Vidya Kendra School in Juhu, Mumbai.
 She provided one way passage to A. C. Bhaktivedanta Swami Prabhupada, Founder Acharya of the International Society for Krishna Consciousness (ISKCON), in 1965.
 She was elected as vice-president of the World Shipping Federation, London, in 1970.
 She served as the chairperson of the Narottam Morarjee Institute of Shipping.
 She was instrumental in bringing the Sindhis from Pakistan during Partition of India.
 She helped to establish a model for modern Indian Shipping companies and offered to world not only business values but also helped propagate ideas of Indian culture and heritage.

Death 

She died due to cardiac arrest on 27 June 1998 at the age of 89.

References

External links 
 Prabhupada letters to Morarjee
 The Straits Times Newspaper - Digitized newspapers Archive at 
 "Padma Awards Directory (1954-2007)". Ministry of Home Affairs (India)

1909 births
1998 deaths
Businesspeople from Mumbai
Indian businesspeople in shipping
Recipients of the Padma Vibhushan in civil service
Businesswomen from Maharashtra
Indian independence activists from Maharashtra
Gujarati people
Gandhians
20th-century Indian businesspeople
20th-century Indian businesswomen